24 is an American dramatic action/thriller television series co-created by Joel Surnow and Robert Cochran. It premiered on Fox on November 6, 2001. 24 centers on the (fictitious) Los Angeles branch of the U.S. government's "Counter Terrorist Unit" (CTU). The series is presented in real time format; each one-hour episode depicts one hour's worth of events, and each season is a 24-hour period in the life of protagonist Jack Bauer (played by Kiefer Sutherland), a CTU agent. The first six seasons of the show are set in Los Angeles and nearby locations – both real and fictional – in California, although other locations have been featured. The television film Redemption is primarily set in the fictional African country, Sangala. The seventh shifts locations to Washington, D.C., and the eighth season is set in New York City. The ninth season Live Another Day takes place in London.

The first three seasons aired over a complete television season between October and May, taking hiatuses between blocks of episodes. Beginning with the fourth season, Fox scheduled 24 to premiere midseason in January with a two-night four-hour premiere, with new episodes airing every week until a two-hour finale in May. Season seven was due to premiere on January 13, 2008, but was delayed an entire year due to the 2007–08 Writers Guild of America strike. Fox aired a two-hour "prequel" film, 24: Redemption, on November 23, 2008, that bridges the gap between seasons six and seven. Season seven premiered on January 11, 2009, with a four-hour premiere over two consecutive nights. Fox announced that the eighth season would be the final season of 24, with the series finale airing May 24, 2010. With the conclusion of the eighth season, 24 aired a total of 192 episodes and the 2-hour television film, 24: Redemption. In 2013, Fox announced that 24 would return with a ninth season  titled 24: Live Another Day containing 12 episodes which debuted on May 5, 2014.

Episodes of 24 are also available in various new media formats. All eight seasons and 24: Redemption are available to purchase as DVD boxsets. Fox provided the five episodes at a time as they were released to Hulu and Fox on Demand, the joint venture it holds with NBC to provide video on demand of the two networks' shows. In the United States and United Kingdom, every episode is available at the iTunes Store to download and playback on home computers and certain iPods.

A total of 204 episodes of 24 aired over nine seasons, from November 2001 to July 2014.

Series overview

Episodes

Season 1 (2001–02)

Season 2 (2002–03)

Season 3 (2003–04)

Season 4 (2005)

Season 5 (2006)

Season 6 (2007)

Redemption (2008)

Season 7 (2009)

Season 8 (2010)

Live Another Day (2014)

References

External links 
 
 

Episodes
24